Curling is a Canadian drama film, directed by Denis Côté and released in 2010. The film stars Emmanuel Bilodeau and Philomène Bilodeau as Jean-François and Julyvonne Sauvageau, a father and daughter who are living in virtual isolation in rural Quebec.

The film premiered at the Locarno International Film Festival, where Emmanuel Bilodeau won the award for Best Actor and Côté won the award for Best Director. The film was named to the Toronto International Film Festival's annual year-end Canada's Top Ten list for 2010.

The film received three Prix Jutra nominations at the 13th Jutra Awards, for Best Film, Best Director (Côté) and Best Actor (Emmanuel Bilodeau). At the 17th Lumières Awards in 2012, the film was a nominee for Best French-Language Film.

References

External links
 

2010 films
Canadian drama films
Films shot in Quebec
Films directed by Denis Côté
Films set in Quebec
2010 drama films
Curling films
French-language Canadian films
2010s Canadian films